Queen Ælfthryth can refer to:
 Ælfthryth, wife of King Coenwulf of Mercia (fl. 810s)
 Ælfthryth, wife of Edgar, king of England, mother of Ethelred the Unready (d. 1000)